Alexandros "Alexis" Alexiou (born 8 September 1963) is a Greek former footballer and manager.

He played for Apollon Kalamarias, Olympiacos, and PAOK, as well as for the national side. He competed at the 1994 FIFA World Cup and he played in 2–0 defeat against Nigeria on 30 June.

References

External links
 
at rsssf.org
at rsssf.org
at rsssf.org
at rsssf.org
at rsssf.org
at rsssf.org
at rsssf.org
at rsssf.org
at rsssf.org
at rsssf.org
at rsssf.org

1963 births
Living people
Greek footballers
Greece under-21 international footballers
Greece international footballers
Apollon Pontou FC players
PAOK FC players
Olympiacos F.C. players
Super League Greece players
1994 FIFA World Cup players
Association football defenders
Footballers from Thessaloniki
Greek football managers
Ilioupoli F.C. managers
Niki Volos F.C. managers
Anagennisi Giannitsa F.C. managers
Apollon Pontou FC managers
Pierikos F.C. managers
Eordaikos 2007 F.C. managers